P're Hanggang sa Huli is a 1995 Filipino action comedy film directed by Ricardo "Bebong" Osorio. It stars Robin Padilla and Andrew E., alongside Matt Ranillo III, Charlene Gonzales, Donita Rose, Amado Cortes, Angelu de Leon, Daniel Fernando, Rommel Padilla and Jean Garcia. Produced by Viva Films, the film was released on March 22, 1995.

Plot
Copper Guerrero (Andrew E.) is a police man who just arrests a group of cattle rustlers and teams up with Brando del Valle (Robin Padilla) who was insulted by their Major due to his stupidity. Brando and Cooper tries to stop some thugs leading to a car chase resulting the thug's car crashes into a gas station destroying it. Cooper was kidnapped along with Jessica (Charlene Gonzales) and her friends by a group of kidnappers led by De Joya (Mat Ranillo III). Cooper was tortured and beaten by De Joya and his men. Brando arrives to rescue him who is helped by Lopez who turns on De Joya and leads them to Jessica in the airport hangar where she is being held by De Joya and his men. They and joined by Lt. Punzalan defeat the kidnappers and rescues Jessica and her friends while Brando kills De Joya who tries to escape on a plane. One of De Joya's men Roque somehow still alive and badly injures Jing-Jing (Angelu De Leon) who notices this and jumps on Brando protecting from the gunshot and Brando throws his army knife at the still alive Roque and Cooper kills him. They mourn Jing-Jing as the Major and his police forces arrives who congratulate Brando but he respectfully rejected his promotion and orders a suspension from his position and he kindly accepts his offer and Brando hands him his badge and Jing-Jing was loaded into the ambulance. Then Lopez leaves on a motorcycle turning out that he was also a police officer who was sent by the Major to help him on the mission. Some time later Brando and Cooper had a romance with Jessica and her friend in the train.

Cast

Robin Padilla as Brando del Valle
Andrew E. as Cooper Guerrero
Charlene Gonzales as Jessica
Donita Rose as Andrea
Matt Ranillo III as De Joya
Amado Cortes as Lt. Punzalan
Angelu De Leon as Jing-Jing
Daniel Fernando as Waldo
Rommel Padilla
Jean Garcia as Tammy 
Gloria Sevilla as Gloria
Bebong Osorio as Lt. Zaragosa
Noni Mauricio as Lopez
Vangie Labalan as Patring
Jun Hidalgo as Boy
Liezel Sicangco
Tweetee Vizcara as a lady in the grocery
Glydel Mercado as a lady in the grocery
Johnny Vicar
Boy Roque as Roque
Rey Bernardino as Trainor
Oliver Osorio as a man of De Joya
Joey Padilla as a man of De Joya
Polly Cadsawan as a "pulis Maynila"
Capt. Elmer Jamias as a "pulis Maynila"
Conrad Poe as a "pulis probinsya"
Zandro Zamora as a "pulis probinsya"
Eddie Tuazon as a "pulis probinsya"
Bomber Moran as a cattle rustler
Ernie Forte as a cattle rustler
Mario Cariño as a military man
Nonoy Zuñiga as a military man
Val Iglesias as Diokno

External links

1995 films
1990s Tagalog-language films
Filipino-language films
Philippine action comedy films
Philippine action films